Abadiano is a Basque surname. Notable people with the surname include:

Benjamin Abadiano (born 1963), Filipino lexicographer
Luis Abadiano (born 1789), Mexican publisher and printer

References

Basque-language surnames